The Bangkok National Museum is the main branch museum of the National Museums in Thailand and also one of the largest museums in Southeast Asia. It features exhibits of Thai art and history. It occupies the former palace of the vice king (or Front Palace), set between Thammasat University and the National Theater, facing Sanam Luang.

The museum was established and opened in 1874 by King Chulalongkorn to exhibit the royal collections of his father King Mongkut. Today the galleries contain exhibits covering the Thai History back to Neolithic times. The collection includes The King Ram Khamhaeng's Inscription, which was inscribed on UNESCO's Memory of the World Programme registered in 2003 in recognition of its significance.

Other than preserving and displaying Thai artifacts dating from the Dvaravati, Srivijaya, to Sukhothai and Ayutthaya periods, the museum also displays extensive collections of regional Asian Buddhist Arts such as Indian Gandhara, Chinese Tang, Vietnamese Cham, Indonesian Java, and Cambodian Khmer arts.

, the museum is nearing the end of a decade-long renovation of its exhibition rooms. Twelve halls have been revamped already. Four more halls will be renovated over the next three years. All will receive new interiors, better lighting, and computer-aided multimedia displays.

History 

Bangkok National Museum was originally established by King Chulalongkorn (Rama V) around the collection of antiquities of his father King Mongkut (Rama IV). The National Museum is on the grounds of the former Wang Na, the "Front Palace" which was built for the vice king, a sort of crown prince (Thailand has no law of primogeniture. The king traditionally named his own successor, who was often his brother rather than his son). The post was eliminated by Chulalongkorn and the National Museum was set up in the former palace in 1887.

In 1874, Chulalongkorn ordered the establishment of the first public museum at the Concordia Pavilion inside the Grand Palace to exhibit the collections of his father and other objects of general interest. The Concordia Museum was opened on 19 September 1874, and the Fine Arts Department has marked that day as the birth of the first national museum of Thailand.

In 1887, Chulalongkorn ordered the museum moved from Concordia to the Front Palace, and called it "Wang Na Museum" or 'Front Palace Museum'.

In 1926, it was named the "Bangkok Museum" and subsequently developed into the Bangkok National Museum, when it came under the direction of the Fine Arts Department in 1934.

Collections 

The National Museum Bangkok currently houses three permanent exhibition galleries:
 The Thai History Gallery in the front of Siwamokhaphiman Hall, a ceremonial building. On display is The King Ram Khamhaeng Inscription, which was inscribed on UNESCO's Memory of the World Programme Register in 2003. Another exhibit tackles the question, "Where did the Thais come from?" Also on display are artifacts from the prehistory period to the Bangkok period. 
 The Archaeological and Art History Collections which are provided in two parts:
 The Prehistory Gallery, at the back of Siwamokhaphiman Hall.
 The Art History Gallery, in the North Wing Building, which displays sculptures and exhibits from the Dvaravati, Srivijaya, and Lopburi periods (before 1257 CE) up to the Bangkok period (c. 1782)
 The Decorative Arts and Ethnological Collection which is displayed in the old central palace buildings. This collection contains artistic, cultural, and ethnographic exhibits such as gold treasures and precious stones, mother of pearl inlay, royal emblems and insignia, costumes and textiles, ceramics, carved ivory, old royal transportation, old weapons and musical instruments.

The buildings
The museum has three main exhibition spaces:

Siwamokhaphiman Hall - This building was built when the Prince Successor to King Rama I, Maha Sura Singhanat, built the Palace of the Prince Successor. Originally used as an audience hall, it now houses the Thai History Gallery.
Buddhaisawan Chapel - The chapel was built in 1787 to house an important Buddha image, Phra Phuttha Sihing. Inside the chapel, murals depict scenes from the life of the Buddha.
The Red House - This teak house was originally one of the private living quarters of Princess Sri Sudarak, the elder sister of King Rama I. It was moved from the old palace in Thonburi to the Grand Palace for Queen Sri Suriyendra, wife of King Rama II. Today the Red House is furnished in early-Bangkok period style which depicts the royal lifestyle of the past with some of the objects once belonging to Queen Sri Suriyendra.

Gallery

References

Further reading

External links 

Museum organization, location, collections and history.

Museums in Bangkok
1874 establishments in Siam
Bangkok
Museums established in 1874
History museums in Thailand
Phra Nakhon district